Carlos Marta (born 31 March 1963) is a Portuguese racing cyclist. He rode in the 1984 Tour de France.

References

1963 births
Living people
Portuguese male cyclists
Place of birth missing (living people)